In mathematical analysis, Parseval's identity, named after Marc-Antoine Parseval, is a fundamental result on the summability of the Fourier series of a function.  Geometrically, it is a generalized Pythagorean theorem for inner-product spaces (which can have an uncountable infinity of basis vectors).

Informally, the identity asserts that the sum of squares of the Fourier coefficients of a function is equal to the integral of the square of the function,

More formally, the result holds as stated provided  is a square-integrable function or, more generally, in Lp space   A similar result is the Plancherel theorem, which asserts that the integral of the square of the Fourier transform of a function is equal to the integral of the square of the function itself.  In one-dimension, for 

Another similar identity  is a one which gives the integral of the fourth power of the function  in terms of its Fourier coefficients given  has a finite-length discrete Fourier transform with  number of coefficients .

if  the identity is simplified to

Generalization of the Pythagorean theorem 

The identity is related to the Pythagorean theorem in the more general setting of a separable Hilbert space as follows.

Then Parseval's identity asserts that for every 

This is directly analogous to the Pythagorean theorem, which asserts that the sum of the squares of the components of a vector in an orthonormal basis is equal to the squared length of the vector.  One can recover the Fourier series version of Parseval's identity by letting  be the Hilbert space  and setting  for 

More generally, Parseval's identity holds in any inner product space, not just separable Hilbert spaces. Thus suppose that  is an inner-product space.

The assumption that  is total is necessary for the validity of the identity. If  is not total, then the equality in Parseval's identity must be replaced by  yielding Bessel's inequality.  This general form of Parseval's identity can be proved using the Riesz–Fischer theorem.

See also

References

 
 .
 .
 .
 .  

Fourier series
Theorems in functional analysis